Lefkada City (Póli tis Lefkádas) is a city and a former municipality on the island of Lefkada, Ionian Islands, Greece. Since the 2011 local government reform it is part of the municipality Lefkada, of which it is a municipal unit. It is the capital and main town of the island of Lefkada, located in the northern and northeastern part of the island. The city had a population of 8,673 inhabitants at the 2011 census. Its next largest towns are Lygiá (pop. 930), Nikiána (724), Apólpaina (819), Frýni (494), Kariótes (532), and Tsoukaládes (514).

Subdivisions
The municipal unit Lefkada is subdivided into the following communities (constituent villages in brackets):

Lefkada City (Lefkada City, Fryni, Kalligoni)
Agios Nikitas
Alexandros (Alexandros, Kollyvata, Nikiana)
Apolpaina
Kalamitsi
Kariotes
Katouna (Katouna, Episkopos, Lygia)
Tsoukalades (Tsoukalades, Kalavros)
Sfakiotes

Climate

Culture

Architecture

The buildings of Lefkada City is a characteristic sample of anti-earthquake structure. The houses are built with wooden material, whole logs, stone chip and other more light materials. The city plan is based in the medieval city plan of Lefkada City. This was developed during the Venetian rule. Lefkada City has old temples built with local traditional architecture. The more famous are the temple of Agios Spyridon, Agioi Anargyroi and Panagia ton Xenon.

Sports
Lefkada City hosts sport clubs in several sports. The most historic is Tilikratis F.C., that was founded in 1925 and recently has played in Gamma Ethniki (third division).

Gallery

References

Populated places in Lefkada (regional unit)
Greek prefectural capitals